Blaenau Gwent is a constituency of the Senedd. It elects one Member of the Senedd by the first past the post method of election. Also, however, it is one of eight constituencies in the South Wales East electoral region, which elects four additional members, in addition to eight constituency members, to produce a degree of proportional representation for the region as a whole.

Boundaries

The constituency was created for the first election to the Assembly, in 1999, with the name and boundaries of the Blaenau Gwent Westminster constituency.

The other seven constituencies of the South Wales East electoral region are Caerphilly, Islwyn, Merthyr Tydfil and Rhymney, Monmouth, Newport East, Newport West and Torfaen.

History
This seat has had large changes in percentages and swing. Labour have had large majorities but following the By-election in 2006 Blaenau Gwent People's Voice gained the seat, with the previous incumbent Peter Law's wife Trish Law taking the seat and holding it in the 2007 National Assembly for Wales election. The party did not stand in the 2011 election and Labour regained the seat with a very large majority. However, in the 2016 election this was slashed with Plaid Cymru increasing their vote from 5.4% to 36.6%. Blaenau Gwent People's Voice won the seat in the 2006 by-election and the 2007 election.

Voting
In general elections for the Senedd, each voter has two votes. The first vote may be used to vote for a candidate to become the Member of the Senedd for the voter's constituency, elected by the first past the post system. The second vote may be used to vote for a regional closed party list of candidates. Additional member seats are allocated from the lists by the d'Hondt method, with constituency results being taken into account in the allocation.

Assembly members and Members of the Senedd

Elections

Elections in the 2020s

Regional Ballot void votes: 165. Want of an Official Mark (0), Voting for more than ONE party or individual candidate (50), Writing or mark by which the Voter could be identified (0), Unmarked or Void for uncertainty (115)

Elections in the 2010s

Regional ballots rejected at the count: 171

Elections in the 2000s

2003 Electorate: 52,927
Regional ballots rejected: 300

Elections in the 1990s

References

Senedd constituencies in the South Wales East electoral region
1999 establishments in Wales
Constituencies established in 1999